The fifth season of Dancing on Ice began airing on 15 November 2019 and ended on 20 December 2019 on Sat.1.

The series was once again filmed in the Magic Media Company Coloneum at Ossendorf in Köln, which was set up for the first and fourth series.

Daniel Boschmann and Marlene Lufen both returned for their second season as hosts.

Daniel Weiss was returned for his fourth series as a judge, as well as Katarina Witt and Judith Williams were returned for their second series, Cale Kalay was not returned this year on Ice panel.

The competition was won by Eric Stehfest with professional partner Amani Fancy.

Couples
On October 10, 2019, Sat.1 announced the 10 couples for this year.

Scoring chart

 indicates the couple eliminated that week
 indicates the couple were in the skate-off but not eliminated
 indicates the winning couple
 indicates the runner-up couple
 indicates the third-place couple
 indicate the highest score for that week
 indicate the lowest score for that week
"—" indicates the couple(s) that did not skate that week

Average chart
This table only counts for dances scored on a traditional 30-point scale.

Live show details

Week 1 (15/17 November)

15 November
The couple with the lowest votes from Live 1 will compete against the couple with the lowest votes from Live 2 in the skate-off on 17 November.

17 November
The couple with the lowest votes from live will compete against the couple with the lowest votes from Live 1 (Peer & Katharina) in the skate-off.

Save Me skates
 Peer & Katharina: "Forever Young"–Alphaville
 Jens & Sabrina: "Diamonds"–Rihanna
Judges' voted to save
 Peer & Katharina

Week 2 (22 November)

Save Me skates
 Nadine K. & Niko: "Skinny Love"–Birdy
 André & Stina: "Uptown Funk"–Mark Ronson ft. Bruno Mars
Judges' voted to save
André & Stina

Week 3 (29 November)

Save Me skates
 Peer & Katharina: "Forever Young"–Alphaville
 Jenny & Jamal: "Black Velvet"–Alannah Myles
 Klaudia & Sevan: "I Will Survive"–Gloria Gaynor
Judges' voted to save
Peer & Katharina

Week 4 (6 December)
 Theme: Christmas

Save Me skates
 Nadine A. & David: "Try"–Pink
 Peer & Katharina: "Apologize"–OneRepublic
Judges' voted to save
Nadine A. & David

Week 5: Semi-final (13 December)

Save Me skates
 Nadine A. & David: "Try"–Pink
 André & Stina: "Uptown Funk"–Mark Ronson ft. Bruno Mars
 Lina & Joti: "Young and Beautiful"–Lana Del Rey
Judges' voted to save
Lina & Joti

Week 6: Final (20 December)

References

External links
Official website

2019 German television seasons
Germany series 5